Hans Gildemeister Bohner (born Juan Pedro Gildemeister Bohner on 9 February 1956), is a Chilean former tennis player of German ancestry , who won four singles and 23 doubles titles during his professional career.  He is the brother of Heinz and Fritz Gildemeister, tennis players and was brother in law of Laura Gildemeister, who was also a tennis player. The right-hander reached his highest singles ATP ranking on 22 February 1980, when he became world No. 12.

He is a former captain of the Chilean Davis Cup team.
In 1977, as a sport figure, Gildemeister was part of Pinochet's inner circle and participated  at the Chacarillas Rally in support of Pinochet.

Grand Slam finals

Doubles (1 loss)

Career finals

Singles: 6 (4 wins, 2 losses)

Doubles: 34 (23 wins, 11 losses)

References

External links
 
 
 

1956 births
Living people
Chilean male tennis players
Chilean people of German descent
Peruvian emigrants to Chile
Tennis players from Santiago
Sportspeople from Lima
Tennis players at the 1991 Pan American Games
Pan American Games competitors for Chile
20th-century Chilean people